Jack Barrett was an Irish Fine Gael politician. A farmer and livestock exporter, he was elected to Seanad Éireann by the Agricultural Panel at the 1973 Seanad election. He did not contest the 1977 Seanad election.

References

Year of birth missing
Year of death missing
Fine Gael senators
Members of the 13th Seanad
20th-century Irish farmers
21st-century Irish farmers